Anna Katrina Simcic (born 8 November 1971), married name Anna Forrest, is a female former New Zealand swimming representative. In August 2021, it was announced that she would feature in the 2021 Season of 
Celebrity Treasure Island 2021.

Swimming career
Simcic represented New Zealand at two Olympic Games.

At the 1992 Summer Olympics she placed 5th in the final of the women's 200 m backstroke. In 1996 at the Atlanta Olympics she placed 6th in the same event.

She won a gold medal at the 1990 Commonwealth Games in the women's 200 m backstroke. At the same Games she also won a silver medal in the women's 100 m backstroke. Four years later at the 1994 Commonwealth Games she won another silver medal in the women's 200 m backstroke. Despite being of New Zealand nationality she won the ASA National British Championships 200 metres backstroke title in 1990.

Personal life
Simcic is married to former professional rugby player Simon Forrest.

References

1971 births
Living people
New Zealand female swimmers
Olympic swimmers of New Zealand
Commonwealth Games gold medallists for New Zealand
Commonwealth Games silver medallists for New Zealand
Swimmers at the 1992 Summer Olympics
Swimmers at the 1996 Summer Olympics
Swimmers at the 1990 Commonwealth Games
Swimmers at the 1994 Commonwealth Games
Commonwealth Games medallists in swimming
New Zealand people of Croatian descent
Female backstroke swimmers
Medallists at the 1990 Commonwealth Games